Houbi District is a rural district of about 22,108 residents in Tainan, Taiwan.

History
After the handover of Taiwan from Japan to the Republic of China in 1945, Houbi was organized as a rural township of Tainan County. On 25 December 2010, Tainan County was merged with Tainan City and Houbi was upgraded to a district of the city.

Administrative divisions 
Dingan, Dingzhang, Fuan, Houba, Houbi, Houbu, Jiadong, Jiamin, Jiatian, Jingli, Jingliao, Kanding, Molin, Pingan, Shian, Tugou, Wushu, Xinjia, Xintung, Zhangan and Zhuxin Village.

Tourist attractions 
 Houbi Huang Family Mansion
 Jingliao Huang Family Mansion
 Saint Cross Church
 Lower Jiadong Taian Temple
 Putuo Buddhist Temple
 Ruan Family Mansion
 Wushulin Sugar Plant

Transportation 

 TRA Houbi Station

Notable natives 
 Hsing Hui, actress

References

External links 

 

Districts of Tainan